SeyedMeysam Aghaei (born June 22, 1990 in Arak) is an Iranian footballer who currently plays for Aluminium of the Azadegan League.
His twin brother sajad plays for Esteghlal

External links 

 Maysam Aghaei  on instagram
 Maysam Aghaei at Soccerway

Professional
Aghaei played for Shensa before joining Rah Ahan.

Club Career Statistics
Last Update  10 May 2013 

 Assist Goals

References

1990 births
Living people
Iranian footballers
Shensa players
Association football midfielders
People from Arak, Iran